Hermanus Gerardus "Herman" Brockmann (14 June 1871 in Amsterdam – 18 January 1936 in The Hague) was a Dutch coxswain who competed in the 1900 Summer Olympics.

He was part of the Dutch boats Minerva Amsterdam, which won the gold medal in the coxed pairs, the silver medal in the coxed fours and the bronze medal in the eights. He also competed in the semi-final of the coxed pairs competition.  However, his 60 kg weight was seen as a considerable disadvantage and he was replaced  by an unknown local boy of 33 kg.  The crew went on to win the final narrowly beating the French team.  Despite not racing the final Brockmann is considered a gold medalist by the IOC and is listed in their medal database.

References

External links

 Profile

1871 births
1936 deaths
Dutch male rowers
Coxswains (rowing)
Olympic rowers of the Netherlands
Rowers at the 1900 Summer Olympics
Olympic gold medalists for the Netherlands
Olympic silver medalists for the Netherlands
Olympic bronze medalists for the Netherlands
Rowers from Amsterdam
Olympic medalists in rowing
Medalists at the 1900 Summer Olympics
20th-century Dutch people